The Chilpancingo National Airport is an airport located in the city of Chilpancingo, Guerrero, México.
The airport serves General Aviation for the Capital of Guerrero, as there are currently no commercial passenger or cargo air carriers operating at the airport.
The ICAO airport code is MMCH, but it does not have an IATA code yet.

This airport only has a single runway, located on the northern side of the city.

External links

Airports in Guerrero
Chilpancingo